Democrat is an unincorporated community in Letcher County, in the U.S. state of Kentucky.

History
A post office called Democrat was established in 1892, and remained in operation until it was discontinued in 1985. The community was so named because the postmaster was politically a Democrat.

Notable person
Samuel C. Collins, physicist, was born at Democrat in 1898.

References

Unincorporated communities in Letcher County, Kentucky
Unincorporated communities in Kentucky